Armetta may refer to:

 Henry Armetta (1888–1945), actor
 Monte Armetta, mountain

See also
 Arnetta, genus of butterflies

Italian-language surnames